Lars Petterson is a Swedish sprint canoeist who competed in the early 1950s. He won a bronze medal in the K-1 1000 m event at the 1950 ICF Canoe Sprint World Championships in Copenhagen.

References

Possibly living people
Swedish male canoeists
Year of birth missing
ICF Canoe Sprint World Championships medalists in kayak